Mike Worsley (born 1 December 1976 in Warrington) is a former Rugby Union prop.

He started with West Park St Helens, while playing in older age-groups for high-flying rugby school St Ambrose College in Altrincham, then followed by Orrell and Bristol before joining London Irish in September 1998. He started in the 2002 Powergen Cup Final at Twickenham, as London Irish defeated the Northampton Saints.

Worsley represented England Schools 18-Group and England U-21s before his form with the exiles propelled him into the England A side. After initially being selected for the England squad to tour New Zealand and Australia in June 2003, Worsley teamed up with the England A squad that won the Churchill Cup in Canada.

He won his first cap as a replacement in the 40-5 victory over Italy in the Six Nations game at Twickenham on 9 March 2003. He then won his second cap in England's 51-15 defeat to Australia  on 26 June 2004.

He toured New Zealand with England in summer 2004 before joining the Churchill Cup in Vancouver.

Mike Worsley joined Harlequins from Zurich Premiership rivals London Irish in the summer of 2003 and was part of the Quins side that defeated London Wasps 33-27 on the opening day of the 2003/04 season (13 September 2003).

Injury forced his retirement at the end of the 2005/06 season.

In September 2009, he became a teacher at Cranleigh School teaching Business Studies as well as being a tutor in one of the houses.

References

External links
 Guinness premiership profile
 Scrum.com profile
 London Irish old boys

1976 births
Living people
Bristol Bears players
England international rugby union players
English rugby union players
Schoolteachers from Surrey
Harlequin F.C. players
London Irish players
Rugby union players from Warrington
People educated at St. Ambrose College
Rugby union props